The Wu-Tang Clan is a New York City–based hip-hop musical group, consisting of nine American rappers: RZA, GZA, Raekwon, U-God, Ghostface Killah, Inspectah Deck, Method Man, Masta Killa, and the late Ol' Dirty Bastard.

One of the most critically and commercially successful hip hop groups of all time, Wu-Tang Clan rose to fame with their uncompromising brand of hardcore rap music. Since their debut, they have introduced or launched the careers of numerous other artists and groups, and already in 1994 there were credited to be over 300 Wu-Tang Clan affiliates, known as the Wu-Tang Killa Bees, consisting of rappers, producers, and record label CEOs. RZA stated that Wu-Tang Clan has sold around 40 million records around the world. That is if you add up the albums from every single MC from the Clan, plus the Wu-Tang itself.

This videography is a list of Wu-Tang Clan and official Wu-Tang Clan affiliates video related releases, including music videos and DVDs.

DVD

References 

Videography
Wu-Tang Clan affiliates
Videographies of American artists